The 2015 NRL Under-20s season (known commercially as the 2015 Holden Cup) was the eighth season of the National Rugby League's Under-20s competition. The draw and structure of the competition mirrored that of the 2015 NRL Telstra Premiership season.

Season summary

Ladder

Grand final

Holden Cup Team of the Year
The 2015 NYC Team of the Year was announced on 14 September.

References